was a Japanese manufacturer of arcade games. It is currently owned by Hitoshi Hamada.

One of their earliest arcade hits was the 1989 rail shooter Dynamite Duke, one of the first to combine close combat with long-range shooting. A year later, Seibu Kaihatsu became best known for their 1990 vertical-scrolling shoot 'em up arcade game Raiden, which was successful enough to earn several sequels and spin-offs in its series of titles. During the late '80s, Fabtek bought the rights to internationally distribute Seibu Kaihatsu's arcade titles outside Japan. This partnership started with Dead Angle, which was Fabtek's first game to be released, and ended with Raiden Fighters Jet, which was both Fabtek's and Seibu Kaihatsu's last game to be released.

In 1999, its arcade division vanished and its official website shut down. It was also rumored that they filed for bankruptcy; in fact, Seibu Kaihatsu temporarily disbanded itself. Therefore, Fabtek's international distribution rights expired while closing its business. During the same year, they established , right before the dissolution of their relationship with adult video game developers h.m.p. and Mink to develop adult mahjong video arcade games. In 2005, the development staff left Seibu Kaihatsu to apply at MOSS, then bought the development rights to the Raiden franchise from Seibu Kaihatsu to develop Raiden III and Raiden IV in order to keep the franchise's fanbase hyped with Seibu Kaihatsu assisting them.

Games by Seibu Kaihatsu
 Stinger (1983) (released as Seibu Denshi)
 Scion (1984) (released as Seibu Denshi)
 Kung-Fu Taikun (1984)
 Knuckle Joe (licensed to Taito) (1985)
 Shot Rider (1985)
 Wiz (1985)
 Empire City: 1931 / Street Fight (licensed to Taito) (1986)
 Panic Road (1986) (co-developed with Visco Corporation and licensed to Taito)
 Air Raid / Cross Shooter (licensed to Taito) (1987)
 Pop'n Run The Videogame (1987) 
 Mustache Boy (licensed to March) (1987)
 Dead Angle (1988)
 Dynamite Duke / The Double Dynamites (licensed to Fabtek) (1989)	
 Raiden (1990)
 Seibu Cup Soccer (1991)
 Olympic Soccer '92 (1992)
 Raiden II (1993)
 Zero Team (1993)
 Raiden DX (1994)
 Senkyu / Battle Balls (1995)
 Viper Phase 1 (1995)
 E-Jan High School (1996)
 Raiden Fighters (licensed to Fabtek) (1996)
 Raiden Fighters 2: Operation Hell Dive (licensed to Tuning / Fabtek) (1997)
 Raiden Fighters Jet (licensed to Tuning / Fabtek) (1998)

See also
MOSS

External links
Official website 
MobyGames Profile
Giant Bomb Profile

Amusement companies of Japan
 
Video game companies of Japan